Larrabee Township is a township in Gove County, Kansas, USA.  As of the 2000 census, its population was 80.

Geography
According to the USGS, it contains two cemeteries: Alanthus and Morning Star.

The streams of Big Windy Creek, Indian Creek and Sand Creek run through this township.

Transportation
Larrabee Township contains one airport or landing strip, Castle Rock Ranch Airport.

References
 USGS Geographic Names Information System (GNIS)

External links
 US-Counties.com
 City-Data.com

Townships in Gove County, Kansas
Townships in Kansas